Morley and Leeds South (often known as Leeds South and Morley) was a borough constituency in West Yorkshire, which returned one Member of Parliament (MP)  to the House of Commons of the Parliament of the United Kingdom from 1983 until it was abolished for the 1997 general election.

History 
This was a safe Labour seat during the three parliaments of its existence. The former Home Secretary Merlyn Rees was the MP from 1983 to 1992.

Boundaries 
The City of Leeds wards of Hunslet, Middleton, Morley North, and Morley South.

The constituency was located on the southern outskirts of the City of Leeds and included the town of Morley. The area is now more or less covered by Leeds Central and Morley and Outwood.

Members of Parliament

Elections

Elections in the 1980s

Elections in the 1990s

See also
List of parliamentary constituencies in West Yorkshire

Notes and references 

Parliamentary constituencies in Yorkshire and the Humber (historic)
Constituencies of the Parliament of the United Kingdom established in 1983
Constituencies of the Parliament of the United Kingdom disestablished in 1997
Politics of Leeds